Ren'ai Township is a mountain indigenous township in Nantou County, Taiwan. It has a population total of 15,691 and an area of 1,273.5312 km2, making it the second largest township by area in the county after Xinyi Township. The populations is mainly of the indigenous Seediq, Atayal and Bunun peoples.

Administrative divisions

1 Rongxing Village　　
2 Cuihua Village
3 Lixing Village　　　
4 Faxiang Village　　　　　　　
5 Datong Village　　  
6 Hezuo Village
7 Douda Village　　   
8 Jingying Village　　　　　　
9 Chunyang Village　　
10 Qinai Village　　　
11 Fazhi Village　　　
12 Zhongzheng Village
13 Wanfeng Village　　
14 Nanfeng Village　　　　　　
15 Xinsheng Village　 
16 Huzhu Village

Tourist attractions

 Aowanda National Forest Recreation Area
 Atayal Resort
 Chuping Archaeological Site
 Huisun Forest Recreation Area
 Mount Hehuan
 Qingjing Farm
 Shimen Mountain
 Small Swiss Garden
 Wujie Dam
 Wushe Dam
 Wushe Incident Memorial Park
 Zhuoshe Mountain

Townships in Nantou County